Gregorioiscala is a genus of sea snails, marine gastropod molluscs in the family Epitoniidae, commonly known as wentletraps.

Species
Species within the genus Funiscala include:
 Gregorioiscala annectens (Powell, 1951)
 Gregorioiscala barazeri Garcia, 2004
 Gregorioiscala crosnieri Garcia, 2004
 Gregorioiscala exfoliata Bouchet & Warén, 1986
 Gregorioiscala federicoi Bonfitto, 2020
 Gregorioiscala fredericqae Garcia, 2004
 Gregorioiscala japonica (Masahito & Habe, 1976)
 Gregorioiscala levismaculosa Garcia, 2004
 Gregorioiscala nevillei Garcia, 2003
 Gregorioiscala nierstraszi (Schepman, 1909)
 Gregorioiscala pachya (Locard, 1897)
 Gregorioiscala pimentai S. Lima & Christoffersen, 2014
 Gregorioiscala polii Cossignani, 2020
 Gregorioiscala sarsii (Kobelt, 1903)
 Gregorioiscala transkeiana (Kilburn, 1985)
 Gregorioiscala unilateralis (Martens, 1902)
 Gregorioiscala xanthotaenia Garcia, 2004
Species brought into synonymy
 Gregorioiscala burchorum (DuShane, 1988): synonom of Opalia burchorum DuShane, 1988
 Gregorioiscala pimentai S. Lima, Christoffersen, Barros & Folly, 2012: synonym of Gregorioiscala pimentai S. Lima & Christoffersen, 2014 (unavailable name)

References

 Garcia, E., 2004. - New records of Opalia-like mollusks (Gastropoda: Epitoniidae) from the Indo-Pacific, with the description of fourteen new species. Novapex 5(1): 1-18

External links
 Cossmann, M. (1912). Essais de paléoconchologie comparée. Neuvième livraison. Paris, The author and J. Lamarre & Cie. 215 pp., 10 pls
 de Gregorio A. (1889). Iconografia conchiologica Mediterranea vivente et terziaria. Annales de Géologie et de Paléontologie. 6: 1-11, 1 pl.
 Gofas, S.; Le Renard, J.; Bouchet, P. (2001). Mollusca. in: Costello, M.J. et al. (eds), European Register of Marine Species: a check-list of the marine species in Europe and a bibliography of guides to their identification. Patrimoines Naturels. 50: 180-213

Epitoniidae